John Joseph Sevcik (born July 11, 1942 in Oak Park, Illinois) is a retired American professional baseball player.

Playing career
A catcher, Sevcik spent the entire  season on the Major League roster of the Minnesota Twins because of the bonus rule then in force that exposed unprotected sophomore professionals to the first-year player draft. He appeared in 12 games that season, with one hit (a double off Wally Bunker of the Baltimore Orioles September 28) in 16 at bats (.063) and one run scored.

He was signed by the Twins as an amateur free agent in 1964 out of the University of Missouri; his twin brother, James, was also signed by Minnesota that spring.

John Sevcik's pro career lasted for eight seasons (1964–71), all but 1965 in minor league baseball. James Sevcik, an outfielder, played for four seasons in the minors.

External links

1942 births
Living people
Baseball players from Illinois
Charlotte Hornets (baseball) players
Denver Bears players
Evansville Triplets players
Major League Baseball catchers
Minnesota Twins players
Missouri Tigers baseball players
Portland Beavers players
Sportspeople from Oak Park, Illinois
Wilson Tobs players
Wisconsin Rapids Twins players